Bernard Sutton (31 March 1892 – 19 April 1978) was a British speed skater. He competed in two events at the 1924 Winter Olympics.

References

External links
 

1892 births
1978 deaths
British male speed skaters
Olympic speed skaters of Great Britain
Speed skaters at the 1924 Winter Olympics
Sportspeople from Norfolk
People from Upwell